Veeranjaneya Temple is a temple on the hill of Ardhagiri, dedicated to Lord Hanuman. It is situated in Aragonda of Chittoor district in the Indian state of Andhra Pradesh.

Etymology 

The hill Ardhagiri literally translates to half mountain, which was a fallen part of Sanjeevani Mountain transported by Lord Hanuman in Treta Yuga. Hence, the name Ardhagiri and the temple was dedicated to Lord Hanuman.

References

External links 

Hindu temples in Chittoor district
Hanuman temples